Psednocnemis is a genus of Southeast Asian tarantulas that was first described by R. C. West, S. C. Nunn & Henry Roughton Hogg in 2012.

Species
 it contains five species, found in Indonesia and Malaysia:
Psednocnemis brachyramosa (West & Nunn, 2010) – Malaysia
Psednocnemis davidgohi West, Nunn & Hogg, 2012 (type) – Malaysia
Psednocnemis gnathospina (West & Nunn, 2010) – Malaysia
Psednocnemis imbellis (Simon, 1891) – Borneo
Psednocnemis jeremyhuffi (West & Nunn, 2010) – Malaysia

See also
 List of Theraphosidae species

References

Theraphosidae genera
Spiders of Asia
Taxa named by Rick C. West
Theraphosidae